Hudson B. Cox was a United States lawyer who served as General Counsel of the Navy from May 16, 1947 until April 29, 1949.

References 

General Counsels of the United States Navy
Year of birth missing
Year of death missing
20th-century American lawyers